Endometrioid tumors are a class of tumor characterized by a resemblance to endometrium/ endometrial carcinoma, and over a third of cases have focal squamous differentiation.

Ovary

They are part of the surface epithelial tumor group of ovarian neoplasms (10–20% of which are the endometrioid type).
Benign and borderline variants are rare, as the majority are malignant.
There is an association with endometriosis and concurrent primary endometrial carcinoma (endometrial cancer).

On gross pathological examination, the tumor is cystic and may be solid and some arise in cystic endometriosis. In 40% of cases, endometrioid tumors are found bilaterally.

Endometrium
Endometrioid carcinoma  can also arise in the endometrium.

Grades 1 and 2 are considered "type 1" endometrial cancer, while grade 3 is considered "type 2".

Light microscopy
Light microscopy shows tubular glands, resembling endometrium.

Molecular biology

CTNNB1 and PTEN mutations
Ovarian and endometrial endometrioid carcinomas have distinct CTNNB1 and PTEN gene mutation profiles. PTEN mutations are more frequent in low-grade endometrial endometrioid carcinomas (67%) compared with low-grade ovarian endometrioid carcinomas (17%). By contrast, CTNNB1 mutations are significantly different in low-grade ovarian endometrioid carcinomas (53%) compared with low-grade endometrial endometrioid carcinomas (28%). This difference in CTNNB1 mutation frequency may be reflective of the distinct tumoral microenvironments; the epithelial cells lining an endometriotic cyst within the ovary are exposed to a highly oxidative environment that promotes tumorigenesis.

References

External links 

Gynaecological cancer